The Satanita [1897] AC 59 is an English contract law case, decided in the Court of Appeal, which concerned the formation of a contract. It is notable because it stands as an example of a case which does not fit the typical pattern of offer and acceptance that English law purports to require to find agreement.

Facts
Lord Dunraven, owner of the Valkyrie II, and A.D. Clarke, owner of the American vessel Satanita, each entered their yachts in a race in the Firth of Clyde organised by the Mudhook Yacht Club. Each agreed to the rules, one of which was that rule breakers were liable for all consequential damage, displacing the statutory position that a defendant's liability is limited. On 5 July 1894, the Satanita collided with Lord Dunraven's yacht, injuring a crewmember ("The unfortunate man was a seaman named Brown, one of whose legs was broken") and causing it to sink.

Judgment
The Court of Appeal held that there was a contract for the owner of The Satanita to pay Lord Dunraven compensation. Lord Esher MR held that a contract had been formed, since "one of the conditions is, that if you do sail for one of such prizes you must enter into an obligation with the owners of the yachts who are competing, which they at the same time enter into similarly with you… If that is so, then when they do sail, and not till then, that relation is immediately formed between the yacht owners". Lopes LJ agreed that there was a contract.

Rigby LJ said that,

House of Lords
Without analysing the issue of whether there was a contract, the House of Lords upheld the Court of Appeal's decision.

See also

English contract law

References

English contract case law
House of Lords cases
1897 in case law
1897 in British law